Buti may refer to:
 Buti-ye Bala
 Buti-ye Pain